Adetomeris is a genus of moths in the family Saturniidae first described by Charles Duncan Michener in 1949.

Species
Adetomeris erythrops (Blanchard, 1852)
Adetomeris microphthalma (Izquierdo, 1895)

References

Hemileucinae
Moth genera